Tillac is a commune in the Gers department in southwestern France.

Geography

Demography

Economy 
 Agriculture: sunflower, corn
 1 gîte: Cap de Boueou (bouéou = ox in Gascon dialect) - Vacation rental in an 18th-century farmhouse.

See also
Communes of the Gers department

References

Communes of Gers